During the 2005–06 English football season, Queens Park Rangers F.C. competed in the Football League Championship.

Season summary 
In the 2005–06 season, QPR struggled to build on the previous years' successes and on 6 February 2006, Holloway was suspended amidst rumours of his departure for Leicester City. He was replaced by a former player; the popular Gary Waddock. The 2005–06 season overall was difficult for QPR both on and off the pitch as financial troubles and boardroom issues combined with a series of poor performances and defeats. However, until the sacking of Ian Holloway, they had been secure in mid-table, it was only a winless run from the end of February to the end of the season, saw QPR drop to 21st.

Off the pitch there was a scandal involving the directors, shareholders and other interested parties which emerged during the 2005–06 season, following allegations of blackmail and threats of violence against the club's chairman Gianni Paladini, who was allegedly held at gunpoint during a match at Loftus Road by hired thugs at the instigation of rival directors. He was later reported to have received threats and was, for a time, wearing a bullet-proof vest. The chairman also launched a strong attack against some critics who he claimed were seeking to destroy the club.

In an unrelated incident youth team footballer Kiyan Prince was murdered on 18 May 2006.

Final league table

Results 
Queens Park Rangers' score comes first

Legend

Football League Championship

FA Cup

League Cup

Players

First-team squad
Squad at end of season

Left club during season

Reserve squad

References

Notes

Queens Park Rangers F.C. seasons
Queens Park Rangers